Lists of cities and towns list notable cities and towns in each country, and are organized by geographic area. See Lists of cities and Lists of towns for additional lists organized in different ways, such as by size.,

Asia

List of cities in Afghanistan
List of cities and towns in Armenia
List of cities in Azerbaijan
List of cities in Bahrain
List of cities and towns in Bangladesh
List of cities, towns and villages in Bhutan
Municipalities of Brunei
List of cities and towns in Cambodia
List of cities in China
List of villages in China
List of cities, towns and villages in Cyprus
List of cities and towns in Georgia (country)
List of towns in Hong Kong
List of villages in Hong Kong
List of cities in India by population
List of towns in India by population
List of Indonesian cities by population
List of cities in Iran by province
List of cities in Iraq
List of cities in Israel
List of cities in Japan
List of towns in Japan
List of villages in Japan
List of cities in Jordan
List of cities in Kazakhstan
List of cities in North Korea
List of cities in South Korea
List of towns in South Korea
List of townships in South Korea
Areas of Kuwait
List of cities in Kyrgyzstan
List of cities in Laos
List of cities and towns in Lebanon
List of towns without municipalities in Lebanon
List of cities in Malaysia
List of cities, towns and villages in the Maldives
List of cities in Mongolia
List of cities and largest towns in Myanmar
List of cities in Nepal
List of cities in Oman
List of cities in Pakistan
List of cities administered by the Palestinian Authority
List of cities in the Philippines
List of cities and municipalities in the Philippines
List of cities in Qatar
List of cities in Russia
List of cities and towns in Saudi Arabia
List of places in Singapore
List of cities in Sri Lanka
List of towns in Sri Lanka
List of cities in Syria
List of administrative divisions of Taiwan
List of cities in Tajikistan
List of towns and villages in Tajikistan
List of municipalities in Thailand
List of largest cities and towns in Turkey
List of municipalities in Turkey
List of cities in Turkmenistan
List of cities, towns and villages in Turkmenistan
List of cities in the United Arab Emirates
List of cities in Uzbekistan
List of cities in Vietnam
List of cities in Yemen

Europe

List of cities in Albania
List of cities and towns in Andorra
List of cities and towns in Armenia
List of cities and towns in Austria
List of cities in Azerbaijan
List of cities and largest towns in Belarus
List of cities in Belgium
List of cities in Bosnia and Herzegovina
List of cities and towns in Bulgaria
List of cities and towns in Croatia
List of cities, towns and villages in Cyprus
List of cities and towns in the Czech Republic
List of cities in Denmark
List of cities and towns in Estonia
List of cities and towns in Finland
List of communes in France with over 20,000 inhabitants
List of cities and towns in Georgia (country)
List of cities and towns in Germany
List of cities in Greece
List of cities and towns of Hungary
Localities of Iceland
List of cities in Ireland
List of cities in Italy
List of cities in Kazakhstan
List of cities in Kosovo
List of cities and towns in Latvia
List of cities in Lithuania
List of towns in Lithuania
List of municipalities in Liechtenstein
List of towns in Luxembourg
List of cities in Malta
List of cities and towns in Moldova
Monaco (city-state)
List of cities in Montenegro
List of cities in the Netherlands
List of cities, towns and villages in the Netherlands by province
List of cities in North Macedonia
List of towns and cities in Norway
List of cities and towns in Poland
List of cities in Portugal
List of towns in Portugal
List of cities and towns in Romania
List of cities and towns in Russia
List of municipalities of San Marino
List of cities in Serbia
List of cities and towns in Slovakia
List of cities and towns in Slovenia
List of municipalities of Spain
List of cities in Sweden
List of cities in Switzerland
List of largest cities and towns in Turkey
List of cities in Ukraine
List of cities in the United Kingdom
List of towns in the United Kingdom

Africa
List of cities in Algeria
List of cities and towns in Angola
List of cities in Chad
List of cities in Libya
List of populated places in Nigeria
List of cities in Madagascar
List of cities in Morocco
List of cities in Somalia
List of municipalities in South Africa
List of cities in Tunisia

North America
List of towns in Canada
Lists of populated places in the United States
List of cities and towns in Greenland

South America and nearby
List of cities in Argentina
List of cities, towns and villages in Barbados
List of cities in Brazil by population
List of towns in Chile
List of cities and towns in Suriname

Australia
List of towns in Australia
List of cities and towns in South Australia
List of towns in Western Australia
(See also List of towns and cities in Australia by year of settlement )

Fictional

List of fictional towns and villages

See also
Lists of towns
Lists of cities
Lists of neighborhoods by city

References